Lake Monocnoc is a lake in the U.S. state of Mississippi.

The name "Lake Monocnoc" may be a transfer from Monocanock Island, in Pennsylvania.

References

Monocnoc
Bodies of water of Washington County, Mississippi